Choate Creek is a stream in Ontonagon County, Michigan, in the United States.

Leander Choate was a large landowner in the area.

See also
List of rivers of Michigan

References

Rivers of Ontonagon County, Michigan
Rivers of Michigan